The 2019 Missouri Valley Conference baseball tournament was held from May 22 through 25.  All eight baseball-sponsoring schools in the conference participated in the double-elimination tournament held at Illinois State's Duffy Bass Field in Normal, Illinois.  The winner of the tournament, Indiana State, earned the conference's automatic bid to the 2019 NCAA Division I baseball tournament.

Seeding and format
The league's eight teams were seeded based on conference winning percentage.  The four lowest seeded teams played in a single elimination round, with the two winners advancing to the six-team double-elimination bracket.

Results

Play-In Round

Double-Elimination Rounds

Conference championship

References

Tournament
Missouri Valley Conference Baseball Tournament
Missouri Valley Conference baseball tournament
Missouri Valley Conference baseball tournament